Ismael Marchal Razquín (born 21 March 1975 in Pamplona, Navarre), known as Irurzun, is a Spanish former professional footballer who played as a striker.

Honours
Real Madrid
La Liga: 1996–97

Málaga
Segunda División: 1998–99

External links

1975 births
Living people
Spanish footballers
Footballers from Pamplona
Association football forwards
La Liga players
Segunda División players
Segunda División B players
Tercera División players
Real Madrid C footballers
Real Madrid Castilla footballers
Real Madrid CF players
Málaga CF players
CA Osasuna players
Racing de Ferrol footballers
Sporting de Gijón players
Gimnàstic de Tarragona footballers
SD Ponferradina players
UD Mutilvera players